Shadow of the Flame is a fantasy novel by Chris Pierson, set in the world of Dragonlance, and based on the Dungeons & Dragons role-playing game. It is the third novel in the "Taladas" series. It was published in paperback in June 2007.

Premise
Shadow of the Flame involves a small band of heroes as war and devastation spread across the continent of Taladas.

Reception

References

2007 American novels
2007 fantasy novels
Dragonlance novels